Missoni is an Italian surname. Notable people with the surname include:

Eduardo Missoni (born 1954), Italian medical doctor 
Margherita Missoni (born 1983), Italian fashion designer, model and actress
Ottavio Missoni (1921–2013), Italian founder of the fashion label Missoni
Roberta Missoni, (born Floriana Panella in 1980), Italian pornographic actress
Vittorio Missoni (1954–2013), Italian CEO of Missoni, the fashion house founded by Ottavio Missoni

See also
 Missoni, high-end Italian fashion house

Italian-language surnames